Morgan Scalley (born October 8, 1979) is an American football coach who is currently the defensive coordinator at the University of Utah. He also played high school football in Salt Lake City at Highland High School and college football at Utah, where he has spent the entirety of his coaching career.

Playing career
Scalley was a defensive back at Utah from 2001 to 2004. During his career at Utah, he was named an All-American, Mountain West co-defensive player of the year, a unanimous first-team all-conference safety, as well as a second-team All-Mountain West Conference in 2003 and a 2× Academic All-American. Scalley was presented with the inaugural Pat Tillman award during the 2005 East-West Shrine Game.

Coaching career

Utah
Scalley began working at Utah in 2006 as an administrative assistant before being named a graduate assistant in 2007. He was promoted to safeties coach in 2008, also assisting with special teams. He added the title of recruiting coordinator in 2009, and also added special teams duties in 2015.

Scalley was promoted to defensive coordinator in 2016 following the retirement of John Pease.

As the lead strategist of one of the nation's top defenses, Scalley was named a Broyles Award finalist in 2019, an award given to the top assistant coach in college football.

Suspension
Scalley admitted in June 2020 that he used a racial slur in a text to a recruit in 2013 and was promptly suspended by the university. An investigation revealed that there were also two additional incidents where Scalley was accused of using racial stereotypes. He was reinstated to his position as defensive coordinator after an external review by the university, but was reported to have taken a significant pay cut and the offer from the university to be its head-coach-in-waiting rescinded among other penalties.

Personal life
Scalley is a member of the LDS church, and served on a mission to Munich, Germany before playing at Utah. He and his wife Liz have three children: Madeline, Emma, and Andrew.

References

External links
 Utah profile

1979 births
Living people
American football defensive backs
Utah Utes football coaches
Utah Utes football players
All-American college football players
Coaches of American football from Utah
Players of American football from Salt Lake City
Latter Day Saints from Utah